Abdul Monem was a Bangladeshi industrialist and entrepreneur. He was given the title of Commercially Important Person by the Government of Bangladesh for his contribution to business. He was the founding chairperson and Managing Director of Abdul Monem Limited. The group owns Igloo ice cream and is the official bottler of Coca-Cola in Bangladesh.

Early life
Monem was born on 5 January 1937 in Brahmanbaria District. He studied civil engineering.

Career

In 1956, Monem founded Abdul Monem Limited. He started the company with a capital of 20 thousand taka. 

Monem served as the Director of NCC Bank, National Life Insurance Company Limited, and Progati Insurance Limited. He bought out K Rahman and Company in 1982. He then started working as an official bottler of Coca-Cola Bangladesh. From 1984 to 1995, he served as the chairperson of the Mohammedan Sporting Club. 

In 2014, Monem was awarded the Presidential Medal for his contribution to the industrial development of Bangladesh. In 2015, Monem founded 216 acre Abdul Monem Economic Zone, one of the first private economic zones in Bangladesh, in Manikganj District.

Monem was awarded the Lifetime achievement award in the Twelve Presents Rise Above All of 2019.

Personal life
Monem was married. He had two sons and three daughters. His sons, ASM Mainuddin Monem, and ASM Mohiuddin Monem, are the Deputy Managing Directors of Abdul Monem Limited. His daughter Dr. Farhana Monem, chairperson of GME Group has got Best Women Tax Payer Award by Bangladesh government for five consecutive years.

Death
Monem was admitted to Square Hospital on 17 May 2020. He died on 31 May 2020 at the Combined Military Hospital, Dhaka, where he was transferred to, from a stroke. He was buried in his family graveyard in Brahmanbaria District.

References

1937 births
2020 deaths
People from Brahmanbaria district
Bangladeshi chairpersons of corporations
Bangladeshi businesspeople